Elgaria is a genus of New World lizards in the family Anguidae.  Their common name is western alligator lizards.

Geographic range
Species in the genus Elgaria are distributed in western North America, from Mexico to Canada.

Species
There are seven species:

Nota bene: A binomial authority in parentheses indicates that the species was originally described in a genus other than Elgaria.

References

Further reading
Gray JE (1838). Catalogue of the Slender-tongued Saurians, with Descriptions of many new Genera and Species. Ann. Mag. Nat. Hist., First Series 1: 274–283, 388–394. (Elgaria, new genus, p. 390).
Gray JE (1845). Catalogue of the Specimens of Lizards in the Collection of the British Museum. London: Trustees of the British Museum. (Edward Newman, printer). xxviii + 289 pp. (Genus Elgaria, p. 46).
Stebbins RC (2003). A Field Guide to Western Reptiles and Amphibians, Third Edition. The Peterson Field Guide Series ®. Boston and New York: Houghton Mifflin. xiii + 533 pp. . (Genus Elgaria, p. 331).

External links

Elgaria
Lizards of North America
Lizard genera
Taxa named by John Edward Gray